The Abominations of Yondo is a collection of fantasy, horror and science fiction short stories by American writer Clark Ashton Smith. It was released in 1960 and was the author's fourth collection of stories published by Arkham House.  It was released in an edition of 2,005 copies.  The stories were mostly written between 1930 and 1935.

The collection contains stories from Smith's major story cycles of Hyperborea, Poseidonis, Averoigne and Zothique.

The title story is told by a man who has been released from being tortured by the priests of the lion-headed god Ong, and who tries to make his way to safety through the desert of Yondo, but is so perturbed by the horrors he encounters that he flees back to the realm of the torturers.

Contents
The Abominations of Yondo contains the following tales:
 "The Abominations of Yondo"
"The White Sybil"
 "The Ice-Demon"
 "The Voyage of King Euvoran"
 "The Witchcraft of Ulua"
 "The Master of the Crabs"
 "A Vintage from Atlantis"
 "The Enchantress of Sylaire"
 "The Dweller in the Gulf"
 "The Dark Age"
 "The Devotee of Evil"
 "The Nameless Offspring"
 "The Epiphany of Death"
"The Third Episode of Vathek" with William Beckford
 "Chinoiserie"
"The Mirror in the Hall of Ebony"
 "The Passing of Aphrodite"

Reprints
Jersey, Channel Islands: Neville Spearman, 1972.
St. Albans, UK: Panther, 1974.

See also
 Clark Ashton Smith bibliography

Sources

External links
 The abominations of Yondo, MSS 378 at L. Tom Perry Special Collections, Harold B. Lee Library, Brigham Young University

1960 short story collections
Fantasy short story collections
Horror short story collections
Science fiction short story collections by Clark Ashton Smith